Miroslav Toth (born December 5, 1978) is a Slovak footballer.

In 2010 Thai Premier League, he was TOT-CAT F.C. top goalscorer with 7 goals.

References
https://web.archive.org/web/20120402052759/http://www.thaipremierleague.co.th/en/players_profile.php?playerID=670

1978 births
Living people
Miroslav Toth
OFK 1948 Veľký Lapáš players
Expatriate footballers in the Czech Republic
Expatriate footballers in Thailand
Slovak expatriate footballers
Slovak footballers
Slovak expatriate sportspeople in the Czech Republic
Slovak expatriate sportspeople in Thailand
Sportspeople from Trebišov
Association football forwards